F. Joseph "Joe" Loeper (born December 23, 1944) is an American politician who represented the 26th senatorial district from 1979 through 2000 in the Pennsylvania State Senate. He resigned his seat in 2000 after pleading guilty to falsifying tax documents.

Early life
Loeper was born in Upper Darby, Pennsylvania, to F. Joseph and Isabel (Martin) Loeper. He attended West Chester University, where he was a member of the Alpha Phi Omega fraternity and received a Bachelor of Science degree in education in 1966. He was a teacher in the Lansdowne-Aldan school district (1966–1967) and the Upper Darby School District (1967–1968). He received a Master of Science degree from Temple University in 1970. In 1972, he became treasurer of the Upper Darby School Board.

Political career
Loeper served as Republican Leader from 1989 through 2000, and as Senate Majority Leader from 1989 through 1992 and again from 1994 through 2000.

Guilty plea
In 2000 he pleaded guilty in federal court of falsifying tax-related documents to conceal more than $330,000 in income he received from a private consulting firm while serving in the Senate. He resigned his senate seat on December 31, 2000, and was later released from federal prison at Fort Dix, New Jersey, after serving six months.

Lobbying career
He is currently working as a lobbyist through his lobbying firm Loeper and Associates representing the Pennsylvania Turnpike, Drexel University, and others.

References

External links

1961 births
Living people
School board members in Pennsylvania
Republican Party Pennsylvania state senators
American people convicted of tax crimes
Pennsylvania politicians convicted of crimes
Temple University alumni
West Chester University alumni
People from Upper Darby Township, Pennsylvania
Educators from Pennsylvania